Cryptaspasma sordida is a species of moth of the family Tortricidae. It is found in New Caledonia and Australia, where it has been recorded from Queensland. The habitat consists of rainforests, as well as planted forests.

References

Moths described in 1945
Microcorsini